Events from the year 1847 in Germany.

Incumbents
 King of Bavaria – Ludwig I.
 King of Hanover – Ernest Augustus
 King of Prussia – Frederick William IV
 King of Saxony – Frederick Augustus II

Event 
 October 12 – German inventors and industrialists Werner von Siemens and Johann Georg Halske found Siemens & Halske to develop the electrical telegraph.

Births 
  February 4 – Remus von Woyrsch, German field marshal (d. 1920)
 February 16 – Philipp Scharwenka, Polish-German composer (d. 1917)
 March 27 – -Otto Wallach, German chemist, Nobel Prize laureate (d. 1931)
 July 20 – Max Liebermann, German painter, printmaker (d. 1935)
 July 25 – Paul Langerhans, German pathologist, biologist (d. 1888)
 October 2 – Paul von Hindenburg, German field marshal, President of Germany (d. 1934)

Deaths 

 May 14 – Fanny Mendelssohn, German composer, pianist (b. 1805)
 July 16 – Karl Friedrich Burdach, German physiologist (b. 1776)
 October 22 – Henriette Herz, German salonnière (b. 1764)
 November 4 – Felix Mendelssohn, German composer (b. 1809)

References 

Years of the 19th century in Germany
Germany
Germany